Bluff River, a mostly perennial stream of the Dumaresq–Macintyre catchment within the Murray–Darling basin, is located in the Northern Tablelands district of New South Wales, Australia.

The river takes its identity at the junction of Five Mile Creek and Seven Mile Creek, on the western slopes of the Great Dividing Range, below Sandy Flat, and flows generally northwest, north, and then southwest, before reaching its confluence with Deepwater River to form the Mole River, near Bluff River National Park; descending  over its  course.

See also
 Rivers of New South Wales
 List of rivers of Australia

References

Rivers of New South Wales
Murray-Darling basin